Neeses is a town in Orangeburg County, South Carolina, United States. The population was 374 at the 2010 census.

Geography
Neeses is located at  (33.535160, -81.125372).

Demographics

As of the census of 2000, there were 413 people, 175 households, and 110 families residing in the town. The population density was 245.9 people per square mile (94.9/km2). There were 204 housing units at an average density of 121.5 per square mile (46.9/km2). The racial makeup of the town was 74.33% White, 20.82% African American, 2.18% Native American, 0.24% Asian, 0.24% from other races, and 2.18% from two or more races. Hispanic or Latino of any race were 1.69% of the population.

There were 175 households, out of which 30.9% had children under the age of 18 living with them, 41.7% were married couples living together, 16.0% had a female householder with no husband present, and 36.6% were non-families. 32.6% of all households were made up of individuals, and 19.4% had someone living alone who was 65 years of age or older. The average household size was 2.36 and the average family size was 2.99.

In the town, the population was spread out, with 26.6% under the age of 18, 7.5% from 18 to 24, 28.3% from 25 to 44, 21.5% from 45 to 64, and 16.0% who were 65 years of age or older. The median age was 36 years. For every 100 females, there were 81.9 males. For every 100 females age 18 and over, there were 79.3 males.

The median income for a household in the town was $20,521, and the median income for a family was $24,125. Males had a median income of $23,500 versus $15,972 for females. The per capita income for the town was $11,377. About 28.5% of families and 29.4% of the population were below the poverty line, including 36.3% of those under age 18 and 24.4% of those age 65 or over.

References

External links
Information about Neeses from Orangeburg County

Towns in Orangeburg County, South Carolina
Towns in South Carolina